Chaplin is a farming, forestry  and cottage community in the eastern Musquodoboit Valley, within the Halifax Regional Municipality Nova Scotia on the St. Mary's Rd. near Route 336.
It is colloquially known as "Woodside Road" to locals, the "Chaplin" designation used on maps and for government reference.

Communications
Telephone exchange 902 - 568
postal code - B0N 2M0

Navigator

References
Explore HRM

Communities in Halifax, Nova Scotia
General Service Areas in Nova Scotia